The Inagua slider (Trachemys stejnegeri malonei) is a subspecies of the Central Antillean slider.  It is endemic to the island of Great Inagua, in the Bahamas.

References

Bibliography 

Trachemys
Reptiles of the Bahamas